Bhanwar Singh Dangawas (7 June 1929 – 2 July 2012) was a member of the 14th Lok Sabha of India. He represented the Nagaur constituency of Rajasthan and was a member of the Bharatiya Janata Party (BJP) political party.

References

External links
 Official biographical sketch in Parliament of India website

1929 births
2012 deaths
Bharatiya Janata Party politicians from Rajasthan
India MPs 2004–2009
People from Nagaur
Lok Sabha members from Rajasthan